DXBM-TV (channel 26) is a television station in Butuan City, Philippines, airing programming from the GMA network. Owned and operated by the network's namesake corporate parent, the station maintains transmitter facilities atop Mayapay, Brgy. Bonbon, Butuan.

About DXBM-TV
GMA Butuan started its operations on Channel 9 (DXBN-TV, now affiliated by the People's Television Network) as an affiliate station of Butuan City Fil-Products from 1986 to 1995 and later transferred to Channel 7 (DXNS-TV) as an affiliate of Northern Mindanao Broadcasting System from 1995 to 2014 with live satellite feed from Metro Manila via DZBB-TV with a TPO of 1 kilowatt. On September 4, 2015, GMA Network commissioned a 5 kilowatt relay station allowing to broadcast programs from GMA Northern Mindanao station (which is based in Cagayan de Oro) and freely received by viewers on UHF Channel 26, bringing the total number of its transmitting stations nationwide to 52.

Since August 28, 2017, GMA Butuan is a semi-satellite station of GMA Davao (TV-5) together with its first ever island-wide newscast One Mindanao as part of the new development, following the newly-relaunch of the network's Regional TV division; which then expanding its local programmings influence to the Southern Mindanao and later to Northern Mindanao and Caraga.

Between February and March 2023, GMA Butuan commenced digital test broadcasts on UHF Channel 15 covering Butuan City and the province of Agusan del Norte as well as several parts of Agusan del Sur.

GMA TV-26 Butuan current programs
 One Mindanao (Monday to Friday; 5:00 PM)
 Biyaheng DO30 (Sundays)
 At Home with GMA Regional TV (Mondays to Fridays 8:00 AM)
All programs are produced and carried by GMA-5 Davao station.

Digital television

Digital channels
UHF Channel 15 (479.143 MHz)

See also
List of GMA Network stations

References

GMA Network stations
Television stations in Butuan
Television channels and stations established in 2015
Digital television stations in the Philippines